The Mingxin Academy is a former tutorial academy in Jiji Township, Nantou County, Taiwan.

History
The academy was built in 1885 during the Qing Dynasty rule as the first private school within the area. In 1908, it moved to its current location. In 1985, the building was designated as Grade 3 historic site.

Exhibitions
The library is arranged with old bookshelves, desks and chairs. There are also various kinds of traditional handicrafts displayed outside the academy building.

Transportation
The building is accessible within walking distance east of Jiji Station of Taiwan Railways.

See also
 List of tourist attractions in Taiwan

References

1885 establishments in Taiwan
Academies in Taiwan
Buildings and structures in Nantou County
School buildings completed in 1885
Tourist attractions in Nantou County